Gav Bast (also Romanized as Gāv Bast) is a village in Emad Deh Rural District, Sahray-ye Bagh District, Larestan County, Fars Province, Iran. At the 2006 census, its population was 358, in 69 families.

References 

Populated places in Larestan County